David Ewart, ISO (18 February 1841 – 6 June 1921) was a Canadian architect who served as Chief Dominion Architect from 1896 to 1914.

As chief government architect he was responsible for many of the federal buildings constructed in this period. He broke with the Neo-Gothic style adopted by his predecessors Thomas Seaton Scott and Thomas Fuller; rather he embraced the Baronial style exemplified in several important buildings.

Personal

Ewart was married to Jeanne Marie Doyen until her death in 1885 and then with Annie Sigsworth Simpson from 1887 to his death in 1921. His son John Albert Ewart was an acclaimed Ottawa architect.

Works

As federal architect he oversaw the design and construction of several buildings at the Central Experimental Farm including the Dominion Observatory, Carling Avenue in 1902; Chief Astronomer's Residence, 1909; and the Geodetic Survey Building, 1914. He also oversaw the design and construction of numerous post offices (such as the Humboldt Post Office). 
He oversaw the design and construction of numerous armouries across Canada.

Alphabetical listing (by community) of Canadian Army Reserve Armouries 

His son John Albert Ewart was also a prominent Ottawa architect.

In 1903, he was awarded the Imperial Service Order.

External links
 David Ewart, Chief Dominion Architect 1896-1914
 Canada`s Historic Sites

References

 

Canadian architects
Canadian Companions of the Imperial Service Order
People associated with Midlothian
Artists from Ottawa
1841 births
1921 deaths